The Civil Aviation (Eurocontrol) Act 1962 (c.8) was an Act of the Parliament of the United Kingdom that brought the treaty establishing EUROCONTROL into effect within the United Kingdom.

Act
The intention was to give effect to the International Convention relating to Cooperation for the Safety of Air Navigation, which created EUROCONTROL. The Act was given the Royal Assent on 21 February 1962. Section 1 of the Act brings the treaty into effect, while Section 2 establishes EUROCONTROL as a corporate body, and Section 3 authorises the British Minister for Aviation to pay the United Kingdom's allotted expenses to maintain the organisation. Section 4 allows the Minister to make orders under the treaty setting charges for air navigation assistance offered by the organisation. The Act was repealed by the Civil Aviation Act 1982.

References

Bibliography

United Kingdom Acts of Parliament 1962
Repealed United Kingdom Acts of Parliament
Aviation law
1962 in aviation
Transport law in the United Kingdom
Civil aviation in the United Kingdom
Aviation history of the United Kingdom
Transport legislation